Rueil-Malmaison is a railway station at Rueil-Malmaison on the A1 branch of the Paris RER commuter rail line.

Railway stations in France opened in 1972
Réseau Express Régional stations in Hauts-de-Seine